Wee Dot is a live album by American saxophonist Dexter Gordon recorded at the Jazzhus Montmartre in Copenhagen, Denmark in 1965 by Danmarks Radio and released on the SteepleChase label in 2003.

Critical reception 

AllMusic critic Thom Jurek stated "Gordon introduces each tune with his gracious, hipster vernacular and trademark dry elegance. There are only four tunes on the set, but they are all extended workouts. The closer, an updated, finger-popping redo of "Second Balcony Jump" (recorded by the saxophonist during his Blue Note years) is surely the finest moment of an already excellent set".

Track listing 
 "Take the "A" Train" (Billy Strayhorn) – 9:35
 Introduction – 0:33
 "My Melancholy Baby" (Ernie Burnett, George Norton) – 8:35
 Introduction – 0:33
 "What's New?" (Bob Haggart, Johnny Burke) – 11:14
 Introduction – 0:37
 "Wee Dot" (J. J. Johnson) – 14:51
 Introduction – 0:41
 "Second Balcony Jump" (Billy Eckstine, Gerald Valentine) – 1:48

Personnel 
Dexter Gordon – tenor saxophone
Atli Bjorn – piano
Benny Nielsen – bass
Finn Frederiksen – drums

References 

SteepleChase Records live albums
Dexter Gordon live albums
2003 live albums
Albums recorded at Jazzhus Montmartre